There have been several rounds of peace talks to halt Russia's 2022 invasion in Ukraine and end the Russo-Ukrainian War in an armistice. The first meeting was held four days after the start of the invasion, on 28 February 2022, in Belarus. It concluded without result, with delegations from both sides returning to their capitals for consultations. A second and third round of talks took place on 3 and 7 March 2022, on the Belarus–Ukraine border, in an undisclosed location in the Gomel region of Belarus. A fourth and fifth round of talks were respectively held on 10 and 14 March in Istanbul, Turkey.

Peace talks and the stability of international borders were further discussed in the Ukrainian parliament during the week of 9 May. Following the 2022 Ukrainian eastern counteroffensive, Russia renewed calls for peace talks. Ukrainian leaders refused to reopen dialogue, claiming that the Russian government was not truly committed to peace and was simply stalling for time while its forces regrouped.

Background

On 24 February 2022, Russian president Vladimir Putin announced he was commencing a "special military operation" in eastern Ukraine. Thousands of Russian troops subsequently entered Ukraine and began targeting Ukrainian military and civilian infrastructure with artillery strikes. Early in the invasion, Putin rejected a provisional peace deal proposed by Deputy Kremlin Chief of Staff Dmitry Kozak, which would have ended hostilities in exchange for guarantees that Ukraine would not join NATO.

During a conversation between Ukrainian president Volodymyr Zelenskyy and Belarusian president Alexander Lukashenko on 27 February, it was agreed that a Ukrainian delegation would meet with Russian officials on the Belarusian border, near the Pripyat River, without preconditions. It was reported that Lukashenko assured Zelenskyy that all planes, helicopters, and missiles on Belarusian territory would remain on the ground during the negotiations.

By 16 March, Mykhailo Podoliak was assigned as the chief negotiator for the Ukrainian peace delegation, who indicated that peace negotiations of a 15-point plan would involve the retraction of Russian forces from their advanced positions in Ukraine, along with international guarantees for military support and alliance in case of renewed Russian military action, in return for Ukraine not pursuing further affiliation with NATO.

Negotiations

Peace talks: First phase of invasion (24 February to 7 April 2022)

First round (28 February)
The first round of talks began on 28 February, near the Belarusian border. The Ukrainian president's office said that the main goals were to call for an immediate ceasefire, and for Russian troops to be withdrawn from Ukraine. It concluded with no immediate agreements.

Second round (3 March)
On 3 March, the second round of peace talks began. Both sides agreed to open humanitarian corridors for evacuating civilians. Russia's demands were Ukraine's recognition of Russian-occupied Crimea, independence for separatist-controlled Luhansk and Donetsk, and "de-militarisation" and "de-Nazification". Ukrainian Foreign Minister Dmytro Kuleba stated that while his country was ready for talks to resume, Russia's demands had not changed.

It was reported on 28 March that three members of the Ukrainian negotiating team, including Russian billionaire Roman Abramovich and Ukrainian politician Rustem Umerov, were suffering from suspected poisoning. According to the independent newspaper Meduza, prior to the alleged poisoning, Umerov was accused by the Kremlin and Russian state-controlled media of being an American spy, and that he was deliberately prolonging the negotiations to Ukraine's advantage. Umerov later wrote on Facebook that he was "fine", calling for people to not trust "unverified information".

On 5 March, Naftali Bennett flew to Moscow and held three hours of meetings with Putin, then flew to Germany and held meetings with German Chancellor Olaf Scholz.  Bennett spoke in advance with Zelensky, who had previously asked for his help mediating.  He also coordinated with the US, France and Germany. According to Al Monitor, the meetings were instigated by Scholz who made a lightning visit to Israel on 3 March and held a long one-on-one meeting, which resulted in the mediation idea. Bennett said in 2023 that both sides had wanted a ceasefire, the odds of the deal holding had been 50-50 and that and that the Western powers backing Ukraine had blocked the deal. Later he expressed doubts regarding the desirability of such a deal.

Third round (7 March)
A third round of negotiations began on 7 March, amidst ongoing fighting and bombing. Although a deal had not been reached yet, Ukrainian negotiator and advisor to the president Mykhailo Podoliak tweeted that "there were some small positive shifts regarding logistics of humanitarian corridors." However, the day before, a Ukrainian negotiator was shot amid claims of spying for Russia.

Antalya Diplomacy Forum (10 March)
On 10 March, Russian foreign Minister Sergey Lavrov and his Ukrainian counterpart Dmytro Kuleba met for talks in Antalya, Turkey with Turkish Foreign Minister Mevlüt Çavuşoğlu as mediator, in the first high-level contact between the two sides since the beginning of the invasion. Ukraine had attempted to negotiate a 24-hour ceasefire to provide aid and evacuation to civilians, especially in Mariupol. After two hours of talks, no agreement was reached. Airstrikes on the port city continued.

Fourth round (14–17 March)

The fourth round of negotiations began on 14 March via video conference. The talks lasted a few hours and ended without a breakthrough. The two sides resumed talks on 15 March, after which Volodymyr Zelenskyy described the talks as beginning to "sound more realistic".

The two sides again resumed talks on 16 March. Later that day, the Financial Times reported that a 15-point plan, first discussed on 14 March, negotiated with the Russians was being identified by Zelenskyy as more realistic for ending the war. After the fourth day of talks on 17 March, Russia said an agreement has not been reached. Following the talks, French Foreign Minister Jean-Yves Le Drian warned that Russia was only "pretending to negotiate", in line with a strategy it has used elsewhere.

On 20 March, Turkey's Foreign Minister Mevlüt Çavuşoğlu, the mediator of the talks, described them as "making progress". Referring to his role as "an honest mediator and facilitator", he gave little further detail.

Following his address to the Israeli parliament, Zelenskyy thanked Israeli prime minister Naftali Bennett for his efforts in encouraging peace talks, and suggested that they might take place in Jerusalem.

Fifth round (21 March) 
The fifth round of talks, on 21 March, failed to achieve a breakthrough. Zelenskyy called for direct talks with Putin to end the war. Sergey Lavrov said direct talks between the two presidents would only go ahead once both sides are closer to reaching a settlement.

Renewal of peace talks: 29–30 March
On 28 March, Zelenskyy confirmed that a renewal of peace talk negotiations with Russia would start in Istanbul on 29 March, with the intention of discussing Ukrainian neutrality, along with the repudiation of any claims for Ukrainian NATO membership in the future. On 29 March, Estonian Prime Minister, Kaja Kallas, indicated in agreement with French minister Le Drian that any Russian offers of peaceful negotiation about Ukraine, or withdrawal from Kyiv, should be regarded with diplomatic skepticism, based on a history of Russian unreliability in similar peace negotiations with other countries.

Peace talks: Second phase of invasion (7 April to 5 September)

April 2022 
According to a May report from Ukrainska Pravda, the Russian side was ready for a meeting between Zelenskyy and Putin, but it later came to a halt after the discovery of Russian war crimes in Ukraine, and the surprise visit on 9 April of British Prime Minister Boris Johnson who told Zelenskyy "Putin is a war criminal, he should be pressured, not negotiated with," and that "even if Ukraine is ready to sign some agreements on guarantees with Putin, they are not." Three days after Johnson left Kyiv, Putin stated publicly that talks with Ukraine "had turned into a dead end". Another three days later, Roman Abramovich visited Kyiv in an attempt to resume negotiations, but was rebuffed by Zelenskyy as a non-neutral party. According to Fiona Hill and Angela Stent writing in Foreign Affairs in September, U.S. officials they spoke with said Russia and Ukraine "appeared to have tentatively agreed on the outlines of a negotiated interim settlement", whereby the Russian forces would withdraw to the pre-invasion line and Ukraine would commit not to seek to join NATO in exchange security guarantees from a number of countries. However, in a July interview with Russian state media, Russian Foreign Minister Sergey Lavrov stated that this compromise was no longer an option, saying that even the Donbas was not enough and that the "geography had changed."

On 7 April, Russian Foreign Minister Sergey Lavrov said that the peace deal Ukraine drafted and presented to the Russian government contained "unacceptable" elements. Lavrov said that the proposal diverged from the terms negotiators had agreed on. Mykhaylo Podolyak, a negotiator for Ukraine, said that the comments from Lavrov are a tactic to draw attention away from the war crime accusations against Russian forces. Lastly, Lavrov stated, "Despite all the provocations, the Russian delegation will continue with the negotiation process, pressing for our own draft agreement that clearly and fully outlines our initial and key positions and requirements."

On 11 April, the Chancellor of Austria, Karl Nehammer, visited and spoke with Putin in Moscow in 'very direct, open and hard' talks which were skeptical of the short-term peaceful resolution of the invasion. By 26 April, the Secretary-General of the United Nations António Guterres visited Russia for the purpose of speaking with Putin and Lavrov in separate meetings, and after the meetings with them indicating skepticism as to any short term resolution of differences between Russia and Ukraine largely due to very different respective perspectives on the circumstances of the invasion presently being adopted by each of the two nations.

May 2022 
At the start of May, Lavrov stated that his belief (prefaced by stating that he "could be wrong") that Hitler was part Jewish; the claim was met with outrage from Israel's government officials. On 5 May, Putin retracted and apologized to Israel's prime minister for Lavrov's comment, who accepted the apology during discussions with Putin about Ukraine. Peace talks and stability of international borders were further discussed in the Ukrainian parliament during the week of 9 May. In the same week both Sweden and Finland applied to become full members of NATO.

Peace talks and stability of international borders were further discussed in parliament during the week of 9 May within both Sweden and Finland for application to become full members of NATO. On 13 May, U.S. Secretary of Defense Lloyd Austin initiated a telephone conversation with Russian Minister of Defense Sergei Shoigu, the first call since 18 February, before the invasion. The call lasted about an hour with Austin urging an immediate ceasefire.

On 15 May, Putin convened the Collective Security Treaty Organization, consisting of Russia, Kazakhstan, Kyrgyzstan, Armenia, Tajikistan, and Belarus, to discuss issues of peace and border security related to Ukraine and NATO. In response to perceived instability of Russia's border with Finland following the application of Finland and Sweden for NATO membership, Defence Minister Sergei Shoigu announced that Russia would deploy and station 12 divisions of troops on Russia's border with Finland. On 22 May, while visiting in Japan to discuss cooperative efforts between Japan and the US to assist peaceful resolutions to the Russian invasion of Ukraine, Biden stated that current US treaties with Taiwan would see the US providing direct military support to Taiwan in the event of diplomatic or military pressure exerted by China, in contrast to the limits of its financial support of Ukraine resisting Russian military operations.

Zelenskyy denounced suggestions by former US diplomat Henry Kissinger that Ukraine should cede control of Crimea and Donbas to Russia in exchange for peace. On 25 May, Zelenskyy said that Ukraine would not agree to peace until Russia agreed to return Crimea and the Donbas region to Ukraine. Zelenskyy stressed that "Ukrainians are not ready to give away their land, to accept that these territories belong to Russia." He emphasized that Ukrainians own the land of Ukraine. , these peace negotiations have been frozen indefinitely.

Peace talks: Third phase of invasion (6 September to present)

September 2022 
In September, Reuters reported that Dmitry Kozak had an agreement with the Ukrainian side with Ukraine's declaration that it will not join NATO, which was presented as Russia's key concern. The agreement was however blocked by Putin, who "expanded his objectives to include annexing swathes of Ukrainian territory". In the same month, Ukraine rejected a peace plan proposed by Mexico.

On 21 September, Zelenskyy addressed the UN General Assembly with a pre-recorded video, laying out five "non-negotiable" conditions for a "peace formula", comprising "just punishment" of Russia for its crimes committed against Ukraine, protection of life by "all available means allowed by the UN charter", restoring security and territorial integrity, security guarantees from other countries, and determination for Ukraine to continue defending itself. Speaking to Bild, Zelenskyy stated that he saw little chance of holding talks with Putin unless Russia withdrew its forces from Ukrainian territory. Following Putin's announcement of Russia annexing four regions of Ukrainian territory it had seized during its invasion, Zelenskyy announced that Ukraine would not hold peace talks with Russia while Putin was president.

October 2022 
Following the October 2022 missile strikes on Ukraine, China and India, who had abstained from condemning Russia at the UN, expressed concern and called for de-escalation and dialogue. Turkish President Erdogan expressed some hope for a diplomatic resolution, saying that Putin "is now more open to possible peace talks" and that Kyiv "was not rejecting such peace talks." The Russian government announced it was ready for a renewed dialogue, and indeed had always been open to negotiating an end to hostilities. The Ukrainian leadership responded that it did not believe Russia was truly committed to peace, and was simply hoping to stall for time while rebuilding its military capabilities for future offensives.

On 3 October 2022, Musk floated a controversial proposal on Twitter, arguing that Ukraine should permanently cede Crimea to Russia, which would be assured of its water supply from Ukraine, and that Ukraine should drop its bid to join NATO. The four-part proposal, posted as a Twitter poll, suggested new referendums under UN supervision on the annexation of Russian-occupied territories. The proposal was welcomed by the Russian government and rebuked by Ukrainian President Volodymyr Zelenskyy as "pro-Russia".

November 2022 
In a video address from November 7, Ukrainian President Zelenskyy named conditions for negotiating with Russia: "One more time: restoration of territorial integrity, respect for the U.N. charter, compensation for all material losses caused by the war, punishment for every war criminal and guarantees that this does not happen again."

U.S. Chairman of the Joint Chief of Staff Mark Milley urged Ukraine and Russia to find a "political solution", saying that the war in Ukraine is unwinnable by purely military means.

December 2022 
In a December 2022 interview with the Associated Press, Ukrainian Foreign Minister Dmytro Kuleba called for a February 2023 peace summit at the UN mediated by secretary-general António Guterres. He stated that Ukraine would only invite Russia if the country faced an international court for war crimes.

Putin's spokesperson Dmitry Peskov said that any peace plan can only proceed from Ukraine's recognition of Russia's sovereignty over the regions it annexed from Ukraine in September 2022.

On 28 December 2022, Russian Foreign Minister Sergey Lavrov stated that peace talks with Ukraine would only resume if it recognized Russia's sovereignty over the annexed and partially occupied regions.

January 2023 
In January 2023, Putin's spokesperson Dmitry Peskov said that "there is currently no prospect for diplomatic means of settling the situation around Ukraine."

Chinese peace proposal 

In a speech at the 59th Munich Security Conference, Chinese foreign policy chief, CCP Politburo member Wang Yi said that CCP general secretary Xi Jinping would present a “peace proposal” to resolve what he described as the "conflict" between Moscow and Kyiv. 

At the UN general assembly marking the anniversary of the invasion, Chinese deputy UN Ambassador proposed China's plan including a ceasefire, dialogue, security guarantees for Russia, protection of civilians and the upholding of territorial integrity, while also insisting that the west was exacerbating the situation by sending weapons to Ukraine. On Feb 24, the Chinese Ministry of Foreign Affairs published as a 12-point position paper on its website titled "China’s Position on the Political Settlement of the Ukraine Crisis", getting mixed responses from Western leaders. President Zelensky stated "I plan to meet Xi Jinping and believe this will be beneficial for our countries and for security in the world", although a time and place for such meeting was not set. 

Russian Foreign Ministry spokeswoman Maria Zakharova responded saying Russia appreciated Beijing's effort to resolve the conflict by peaceful means but that Russia was "open to achieving the goals of the special military operation by political and diplomatic means" and that it would entail recognising "new territorital realities" in Ukraine, referring to Russia's annexation of Donetsk, Kherson, Luhansk and Zaporizhzhia oblasts. Putin's spokesperson Dmitry Peskov said that "for now, we don't see any of the conditions that are needed to bring this whole story towards peace."
 
On 7 March 2023, China's Foreign Minister Qin Gang remarked, "the Ukraine crisis seems to be driven by an invisible hand pushing for the protraction and escalation of the conflict." He insisted that sanctions, and political pressure will not solve the problem. Qin also said Beijing has not provided weapons to either side of the Ukraine conflict. He added that "the process of peace talks should begin as soon as possible". The PRC has called for peace negotiations since the conflict began to address the legitimate security concerns of all parties involved.

Agreements regarding grain exports

Russia and Ukraine signed agreements with Turkey and the United Nations on 22 July 2022, intended to secure exports via the Black Sea of grain from both countries and fertilizer from Russia, to ease shortages in developing countries. The next day, Russia fired missiles at the port city of Odesa, through which Ukrainian grain flows and formally declared Ukrainian ports unsafe. As a result of the agreement, the first shipment of Ukraine grain to international destinations started on 1 August 2022.

Opinion polls 
In the poll conducted by the Kyiv International Institute of Sociology (KIIS) between 13 and 18 May 2022, 82% of Ukrainians said they did not support any territorial concessions to Russia, even if it would prolong the war. Another KIIS poll conducted in September 2022 found that 87% of Ukrainians opposed any territorial concessions to Russia.

According to a survey conducted by the Levada Center at the end of October 2022, 57% of Russian respondents favored the start of peace talks with Ukraine, and 36% preferred the continuation of hostilities.

See also 

 Black Sea Grain Initiative
 Minsk agreements
 Normandy Format
 Zaporizhzhia Nuclear Power Plant crisis
 1918 Russia–Ukraine negotiations

References

Peace negotiations
Russia-Ukraine
Russia–Ukraine relations